Erik van Zuylen (born 1943) is a Dutch film director and screenwriter. He has directed nine films between 1975 and 2005.

Selected filmography
 In for Treatment (1979)
 Alissa in Concert (1990)

References

External links

1943 births
Living people
Dutch film directors
Dutch male screenwriters
Dutch screenwriters
Mass media people from Utrecht (city)
20th-century Dutch people